Christopher James Quinn (born September 27, 1983) is an American professional basketball coach and former player who is the assistant coach for the Miami Heat of the National Basketball Association (NBA).

High school
Quinn played his high school basketball at Dublin Coffman High School in Dublin, Ohio, where he set 14 school records and was named Columbus Dispatch Player of the Year in 2002. He was also twice named first-team all-state and was runner-up for Mr. Basketball honors in Ohio as a senior finishing behind NBA star LeBron James. Having also been named the Ohio Capital Conference Player of the Year, Quinn led his team to back-to-back conference championships, as well as two straight district championships.

College career
At the University of Notre Dame, Quinn was a three-year starter and two-time co-captain. He finished his career averaging 14.6 points, 3.5 assists, 2.7 rebounds and 1.27 steals per game. As a senior, he led the team in scoring (17.7 ppg), assists (6.4 apg) and was tied for first in steals (1.55 spg), while shooting 42 percent from three-point range. Quinn was a First Team All-Big East selection as a senior and also was a Big East Academic All-Star selection as a freshman.

Professional career
Having not been selected in the 2006 NBA draft, Quinn signed a partially guaranteed contract with the Miami Heat, and played for the team in the Orlando Summer League. During his first season, he played in 42 games and, in a February 5 bout against the Charlotte Bobcats, started his first ever game for the Heat, filling in for a suspended Gary Payton, and scored 14 points. He also dished 9 assists in an April 16 match against the Boston Celtics. During that first season, Quinn showed competent ballhandling skills and shooting touch, although he was left out of the Heat's playoff roster.

In 2007–08, with Payton's retirement and constant injuries to Dwyane Wade and Smush Parker, Quinn garnered more playing time, especially before the February trade that brought Marcus Banks from the Phoenix Suns. He scored a season-high 22 points against the Washington Wizards on December 13, connecting six three-point field goals.

Quinn scored a career high 26 points against the Detroit Pistons on April 15, 2009, on 9-of-13 shooting. He scored 19 of the Heat's last 30 points in the game.

On January 5, 2010, Quinn was traded along with a 2012 second round draft pick and cash to the New Jersey Nets for a conditional second round pick in 2010 NBA draft.

In October 2010, Quinn joined the Philadelphia 76ers for training camp, but he was waived. He was signed by the San Antonio Spurs in November 2010.

On July 21, 2011, he joined the VTB United League club Khimki Moscow Region. In November 2012, he joined the Spanish League club Valencia. He then signed with the NBA D-League's Tulsa 66ers on December 28, 2012.

On March 20, 2013, Quinn was signed by the Cleveland Cavaliers for the rest of the 2012–13 NBA season.

On July 19, 2013, he was waived by the Cavaliers.

Coaching career
On October 28, 2013, Quinn was hired by Northwestern coach Chris Collins to serve as the team’s new director of player development.

On September 17, 2014, Quinn was hired as an assistant coach by the NBA team that originally signed him as a player, the Miami Heat.

On March 26, 2022, Heat head coach Erik Spoelstra would miss the game against the Brooklyn Nets, which was announced only hours before the game. Quinn was tapped to fill in. He said he would follow Spoelstra's coaching style: "I’m not rewriting the book by any means. We have a system and culture in place." It was the first time Quinn ever exercised the duties of the head coach. Team captain Udonis Haslem said of Quinn, "When you listen to Quinny, you’re hearing Spo. It’s the same message." Haslem added, "He has the knowledge, the experience, the relationship with the players. He has every base covered when you talk about checking the boxes to have the ability to be a successful head coach.” When asked who would take over from Quinn if he were ejected from the game, Quinn said it would be Malik Allen, then Caron Butler.

On April 3, 2022, Spoelstra entered team health and safety protocols, and Quinn once again served as substitute head coach for the Heat, which was Kyle Lowry's first game against his previous team, the Toronto Raptors. It was Quinn's first win as a head coach, and it was the first time a substitute head coach won a game when Spoelstra was absent. Quinn lost the earlier game against Brooklyn, while Dan Craig, who filled in for Spoelstra in 2018 and 2019, lost both games against Indiana Pacers and the Boston Celtics respectively.

NBA career statistics

Regular season

|-
| style="text-align:left;"|
| style="text-align:left;"|Miami
| 42 || 1 || 9.7 || .366 || .351 || .676 || .7 || 1.5 || .4 || .0 || 3.4
|-
| style="text-align:left;"|
| style="text-align:left;"|Miami
| 60 || 25 || 22.3 || .424 || .403 || .867 || 2.0 || 3.0 || .8 || .1 || 7.8
|-
| style="text-align:left;"|
| style="text-align:left;"|Miami
| 66 || 0 || 14.6 || .408 || .409 || .810 || 1.1 || 2.0 || .4 || .0 || 5.1
|-
| style="text-align:left;"|
| style="text-align:left;"|New Jersey
| 25 || 0 || 8.9 || .357 || .313 || 1.000 || .6 || 1.2 || .4 || .0 || 2.2
|-
| style="text-align:left;"|
| style="text-align:left;"|San Antonio
| 41 || 0 || 7.1 || .363 || .297 || .500 || .6 || 1.0 || .1 || .0 || 2.0
|-
| style="text-align:left;"|
| style="text-align:left;"|Cleveland
| 7 || 0 || 11.1 || .250 || .000 || 1.000 || .3 || 1.3 || .4 || .0 || 1.4
|- class="sortbottom"
| style="text-align:center;" colspan="2"|Career
| 241 || 26 || 13.7 || .399 || .377 || .809 || 1.1 || 1.9 || .4 || .0 || 4.5

Playoffs

|-
| style="text-align:left;"|2009
| style="text-align:left;"|Miami
| 5 || 0 || 4.8 || .429 || .000 || 1.000 || .2 || 1.0 || .4 || .0 || 1.6
|- class="sortbottom"
| style="text-align:center;" colspan="2"|Career
| 5 || 0 || 4.8 || .429 || .000 || 1.000 || .2 || 1.0 || .4 || .0 || 1.6

References

External links

 Notre Dame bio
 NBA D-League bio

1983 births
Living people
American expatriate basketball people in Russia
American expatriate basketball people in Spain
American men's basketball players
Basketball coaches from Louisiana
Basketball players from New Orleans
BC Khimki players
Cleveland Cavaliers players
Liga ACB players
Miami Heat assistant coaches
Miami Heat players
New Jersey Nets players
Northwestern Wildcats men's basketball coaches
Notre Dame Fighting Irish men's basketball players
People from Dublin, Ohio
Point guards
San Antonio Spurs players
Tulsa 66ers players
Undrafted National Basketball Association players
Valencia Basket players